Carlos Ramirez de Azevedo Silva Pala (born 26 July 1985) is a Brazilian individual and synchronised trampoline gymnast, representing his nation at international competitions. He competed at world championships, including at the 2010, 2011, 2013, 2014 and 2015 Trampoline World Championships.

References

External links
 
 

1985 births
Living people
Brazilian male trampolinists
Place of birth missing (living people)
Gymnasts at the 2011 Pan American Games
Gymnasts at the 2015 Pan American Games
Pan American Games competitors for Brazil
21st-century Brazilian people